Raijin-2 (Rising-2) is a Japanese micro-satellite launched in 2014. The satellite is built around a 10 cm diameter, 1m focal length Cassegrain telescope and features the following instruments:
 HPT - main telescope with 5m resolution at nadir, operating in visible and near-infrared bands
 BOL - bolometer array camera for cloud temperature measurement
 WFC - wide field-of-view CCD camera
 LSI-N and LSI-W - 2 CMOS medium field-of-view cameras for near-infrared imaging
 VLF-ANT, R - radio antenna to receive signatures of lighting events 
All instruments are powered by GaAs solar cells mounted on the spacecraft body, with estimated electrical power of 47.6W. The spacecraft features an unusual central-pillar bus, inherited from the Sprite-Sat satellite. The attitude control is done by means of reaction wheels and magneto-torquers, and qualified for 0.1 degrees angular accuracy.

Launch
RISING-2 was launched from Tanegashima, Japan, on 24 May 2014 by a H-IIA rocket.

Mission
The satellite is intended for atmosphere research, especially for gathering statistics on cloud formation and the occurrence of sprites in the upper atmosphere. Mission data are down-linked in S-band with maximal data rate of 38.4 kbit/s.

See also

 2014 in spaceflight

References

External links
RISING-2 mission equipment 
eoPortal RISING-2 page

Earth observation satellites of Japan
Spacecraft launched in 2014
Spacecraft launched by H-II rockets